The Banister River is a tributary of the Dan River, about 65 mi (105 km) long, in southern Virginia in the United States.  Via the Dan, it is part of the watershed of the Roanoke River, which flows to the Atlantic Ocean.  It rises on Brier Mountain in western Pittsylvania County and flows generally eastwardly into Halifax County, past the town of Halifax.  It joins the Dan River 6 mi (9.7 km) east of the town of South Boston.

In Pittsylvania County the Banister collects the Stinking River.

Variant names
According to the Geographic Names Information System, it has also been known historically as:
 Bannister River

See also
List of Virginia rivers

References

Columbia Gazetteer of North America entry
DeLorme (2005).  Virginia Atlas & Gazetteer.  Yarmouth, Maine: DeLorme.  .

Rivers of Virginia
Rivers of Halifax County, Virginia
Rivers of Pittsylvania County, Virginia
Tributaries of the Roanoke River